Didier Squiban (born 23 September 1959 in Ploudalmézeau (Finistère)) is a French pianist and composer.

His musical work is a combination of traditional Breton music, jazz improvisation and classical romanticism and has added the piano to the repertoire of modern Breton music.

He has been influenced by Duke Ellington, Keith Jarrett, Charlie Parker and Bill Evans as well as Debussy, Stravinsky, Erik Satie, Darius Milhaud, Schönberg and Glenn Gould. In 1993, he worked as the accompanying pianist for the Breton singer Yann-Fañch Kemener in the acclaimed live show Héritage des Celtes (The Heritage of the Celts) and thereby got closer in touch with the music of his home region Brittany. In 1997, on the island of his ancestors, Molène, he recorded his first Breton solo piano album: "Molène".

Discography

Solo piano
Molène Saison II (2013)
Tournée des chapelles 2004 (2005)
Ballades (2003)
Trilogie pour piano (2001)
Rozbras (2001)
Porz Gwenn (1999)
Molène (1997)
Concert Lorient (recorded at the Festival Interceltique de Lorient) (2000)

With band
Bangor - Formation Sirius (L'orchestre de Jazz de Bretagne) (1995)
Jazz à Vauban (1994)
Tendances (1990)
La Plage (2006)

With orchestra
Symphonie Iroise (2004)
Symphonie Bretagne (2000)

Cooperations
Manu Lann Huel chante Léo Ferré - Lann Huel/Squiban/Trévarin (2003)
Kimiad - Kemener/Squiban (2000)
Île-Exil - Kemener/Squiban (1996)
Penn-Ar-Bed/Brest 96 - Didier Squiban & An Tour Tan (1996)
Karnag "Pierre Lumière"(1996)
Enez Eusa - Kemener/Squiban (1995)
Héritage des Celtes en concert - Dan Ar Braz (1995)
Live - Didier Squiban & An Tour Tan (1997)

References

External links
website about Didier Squiban (French)
L'OZ record label

Breton musicians
21st-century French male pianists
20th-century French male pianists
French male composers
Living people
1959 births
People from Finistère
Rennes 2 University alumni